Lily Sobhani (born 15 October 1976) is a live events producer who specializes in producing large, internationally broadcast music events, usually with a charity component.

Life
Sobhani was born on 15 October 1976 in Norfolk, England. She has been working in music and live event production for 15 years, and in that time she has produced, promoted, distributed and messaged countless cause-related and charity concerts. Her first major production as an executive producer was the original Fairplay concert in 2002 for Oxfam's Make Trade Fair campaign, which she produced through her company Bottle, with partners Emily Eavis and Marianne Troup.

Career

Live 8
In June 2005, Sobhani was called upon by the Make Poverty History coalition to execute a concert in Japan for the Live 8 concert series.  In a span of 4 weeks, Sobhani accomplished the impossible task of securing the venue, artists, broadcast partners and financing, and developing local messaging, for the event at Makuhari Messe in Japan, on the outskirts of Tokyo. The show, Live 8 concert, Chiba, prompted the Japanese Government to add 2 billion dollars more aid for the poorest countries of the world a few days later.

Live Earth
During that experience Sobhani met Kevin Wall, founder of Live Earth and Exec Producer of Live 8, and when Live Earth was conceived, she was one of the first people he called on. Lily became Worldwide Head of Events, responsible for the delivery of all Live Earth music concerts. In this capacity, Sobhani supervised teams responsible for all facets of production – from staging and lighting design to promotion, finance, broadcast capture and distribution and artist coordination. The original Live Earth was a set of 9 concerts staged on 7 continents over 24 hours, and was broadcast to 2 billion people on 7 July 2007. It became the largest global entertainment event ever held.

Following this, Sobhani was again tapped by Kevin Wall to produce an additional Live Earth concert to take place in Mumbai, India. Live Earth India was scheduled to take place 7 December 2008. Unfortunately, the concert was cancelled shortly after the November 2008 Mumbai terrorist attacks on 26 November 2008.

In early 2010, Sobhani was asked last minute to step in and help oversee the Chicago portion of the Live Earth Run for Water.

FIFA World Cup Kick-Off Celebration Concert

Most recently, Lily Sobhani produced the inaugural Official FIFA 2010 World Cup Kickoff Celebration Concert, which opened the 2010 FIFA World Cup tournament on 10 June. It featured live performances from Black Eyed Peas, Shakira, Alicia Keys, John Legend and Juanes, as well as an amazing blend of African artists including Amadou & Mariam, Angelique Kidjo, BLK JKS and Tinariwen.

The Secret Policeman's Ball

Sobhani executive produced the American reboot of The Secret Policeman's Ball at the Radio City Music Hall in New York on 4 March 2012, a celebration of Amnesty International's 50th Anniversary. The event was a tremendous success with a focus on comedy: Russell Brand, Jon Stewart, Rashida Jones, Chris O'Dowd, Jason Sudeikis, Paul Rudd, Catherine Tate, Noel Fielding, Jimmy Carr, Sarah Silverman, David Cross, Ben Stiller, David Walliams, Liam Neeson, Jack Whitehall and many more all taking to the stage. Together with these comedy stars, Coldplay and Mumford & Sons played sets, headlining the event.

Lily currently resides in Los Angeles, CA.

References

British theatre managers and producers
Women theatre managers and producers
Living people
1976 births